Gorkhi गोर्खी पीपलकोट is a village of Pipalkot VDC. Gorkhi is the ward NO.8 village. The population of the village is 630, in 103 households.

Gorkhi is a remote village of the Dailekh District.

See also
Pipalkot VDC
Dailekh District

References

Populated places in Dailekh District